Hannah Montana 2: Non-Stop Dance Party is the first remix album for the television series Hannah Montana, released on January 29, 2008  by Walt Disney Records. It includes remixed versions of songs previously featured on its second soundtrack Hannah Montana 2 (2007). All eleven tracks are performed by the series' primary actress Miley Cyrus, and are credited to the title character Hannah Montana.

This CD includes the bonus track "Chris Cox Megamix", live performance videos from the London concert ("Nobody's Perfect" and "Life's What You Make It"), a photo slideshow, and printable party invitations. The Walmart edition contains an exclusive bonus track, a remix of "This Is the Life".

The official Walt Disney Records website created the Hannah Montana: Make-a-Mix game to promote the dance party CD. The album sold 40,000 copies in its first week The album was only released in the US.

All the songs were remixed and produced by Chris Cox except the Walmart exclusive bonus track remix of "This Is the Life", which was remixed and produced by Marco Marinangeli.

Track listing

Charts

Weekly charts

Year-end charts

Certifications

References

External links
 Credits on AllMusic

Hannah Montana albums
2008 remix albums
2008 soundtrack albums
Walt Disney Records soundtracks
Walt Disney Records remix albums
Teen pop remix albums
Pop rock remix albums